Metaphycus is a genus of wasps belonging to the family Encyrtidae.

The genus has cosmopolitan distribution.

Species

Species:

Metaphycus acanthococci 
Metaphycus acanthococci 
Metaphycus aegle 
Metaphycus helvolus

References

Encyrtidae
Hymenoptera genera